Peter Keeley may refer to:

 Peter Keeley, Northern Irish soldier and reputed MI5 intelligence agent, also known as Kevin Fulton
 Peter Keeley (screenwriter), British screenwriter, actor and presenter

See also
Peter Keely (1922–2004), Irish footballer